The 1953 Cupa României Final was the 16th final of Romania's most prestigious football cup competition. It was disputed between CCA București and Flamura Roşie Arad, and was won by Flamura Roşie Arad after a game with 1 goal, in extra time. It was the second cup for Flamura Roşie Arad after the one from 1947–48 season.

Match details

See also 
List of Cupa României finals

References

External links
Romaniansoccer.ro

1953
Cupa
Romania